József Moravetz or Iosif Moravet' (14 January 1911 – 16 February 1990) was a Romanian footballer who played as a midfielder.

Biography 
Moravetz was born in Austria-Hungary, now in Romania. He played in Liga I for RGMT Timişoara, and played in the 1934 World Cup in Italy. They were eliminated in the first round after losing 2–1 to Czechoslovakia.

Honours
Ripensia Timișoara
Liga I (1): 1935–36
Cupa României (1): 1935–36

Notes and references 
Evidence of József Moravetz's caps for Romania national football team

Austro-Hungarian people
1911 births
1990 deaths
Romania international footballers
Romanian footballers
1934 FIFA World Cup players
Liga I players
Liga II players
FC Ripensia Timișoara players
Association football midfielders